I Nyoman Sukarja (born 17 August 1989, in Denpasar) is an Indonesian professional footballer who plays as a winger for Liga 2 club PSKC Cimahi.

Club career

Sulut United
In 2021, Nyoman Sukarja signed a contract with Indonesian Liga 2 club Sulut United. He made his league debut on 28 October 2021 in a match against Kalteng Putra at the Tuah Pahoe Stadium, Palangkaraya.

References

External links
 I Nyoman Sukarja at Soccerway
 I Nyoman Sukarja at Liga Indonesia

1989 births
Living people
Indonesian footballers
People from Denpasar
Sportspeople from Bali
Persija Jakarta (IPL) players
PSIS Semarang players
Bali United F.C. players
Indonesian Premier Division players
Indonesian Premier League players
Association football forwards
Liga 1 (Indonesia) players
Liga 2 (Indonesia) players